The Big Picture is a 2009 avant-garde jazz studio album by English guitarist and composer Fred Frith and the Swiss-based ARTE Quartett. It was recorded in January 2008 at Swiss Radio DRS2 in Zürich, Switzerland, and was released in 2009 by Intakt Records, together with Frith and the ARTE Quartett's first collaborative album, Still Urban, which was also recorded in January 2008 at Swiss Radio DRS2.

The Big Picture comprises two suites of music, The Big Picture for saxophone quartet with two improvising soloists, composed by Frith in 2000, and Freedom in Fragments for saxophone quartet, composed by Frith in 1994. Freedom in Fragments was originally written for the Rova Saxophone Quartet and was performed by them on Frith's 2002 solo album Freedom in Fragments.

Frith does not perform on The Big Picture.

Reception
In a review at All About Jazz, Marc Medwin stated that The Big Picture illustrates Frith's "fascinating approach to composition". He called the ARTE Quartett's playing "virtuosic", especially in their handling of the Freedom in Fragments suite. Medwin found "Song and Dance" "much livelier and ... more fluid" than the original Rova Saxophone Quartet's interpretation, and "Red Rag" "particularly infectious".

Reviewing the album in Jazzwise, Duncan Heining described The Big Picture suite as "a series of miniatures" that is "remarkably concise, focused and magnificently performed". He said the composition is reminiscent of Varèse or Xenakis. Heining called Freedom in Fragments "an essay on the subject of musical freedom" that "twists and turns across the landscape". He opined that the music is "[d]emanding and challenging" and calls for "repeated listening".

Michael Rosenstein wrote in a review of the album in Cadence that The Big Picture suite is made up of six short pieces that "act as episodic juxtapositions of the extremes of timbre and range of the saxophones". He said there is "plenty of textural variety" and occasionally melodies surface. In Freedom in Fragments Rosenstein complimented the quartet's handling of Frith's "themes and tight arrangements", but did feel that the constraints of the composition leaves "little room for the group to stretch things much".

Writing in The Wire, Julian Cowley called the Big Picture suite "a lively negotiation" between the Arte Quartett and the "less orderly improvised responses" of the guest pianist and drummer. In Freedom in Fragments he said the quartet "explore[s] unconventional techniques", plays "folksy" and "noir melancholy" tunes, and each member contributes an improvised solo. But Cowley found that, on the whole, the music did not "mov[e] or stimulat[e]" him. He stated that "saxophone quartets leave me with an uncomfortable sense of the sentimental convenience of family groups".

Track listing

Source: CD liner notes, Fred Frith discography.

Personnel
ARTE Quartett
Beat Hofstetter – soprano saxophone
Sascha Armbruster – alto saxophone
Andrea Formenti – tenor saxophone
Beat Kappeler – baritone and alto saxophones
Guests on The Big Picture suite
Katharina Weber – piano
Lucas Niggli – drums

Source: CD liner notes, Fred Frith discography.

Production and artwork
Recorded at Swiss Radio DRS2, Zürich, Switzerland by Ron Kurz in January 2009
Edited and mixed at Guerrilla Recording, Oakland, California in March 2008
Mastered at Headless Buddha Mastering Labs, Oakland by Myles Boisen in June 2008
Cover art by Heike Liss
Cover design by Jonas Schoder
Produced by Intakt Records

Source: CD liner notes.

References

External links
Still Urban / The Big Picture at Intakt Records
Still Urban / The Big Picture reviews at Intakt Records

The Big Picture home page

2009 albums
Fred Frith albums
Collaborative albums
Avant-garde jazz albums
Free improvisation albums
Intakt Records albums